The Utah Compact is a declaration of five principles whose stated purpose is to "guide Utah's immigration discussion." At a ceremony held on the grounds of the Utah State Capitol on November 11, 2010, it was signed by business, law enforcement and religious leaders including the Catholic Diocese of Salt Lake City, and by various other community leaders and individuals.

Principles 
The Principles of the Utah Compact are

 Federal Solutions. Immigration, including border policy is a federal issue.
 Law Enforcement. Law Enforcement should have discretion. Local law enforcement should focus on criminal activity rather than violations of federal civil code.
 Families. Stating opposition to policies that unnecessarily separate families.
 Economy. Recognition of the economic role of immigrants. Advocates support for free market policies to maximize individual freedom and opportunity.
 A Free Society. Recognition that immigrants are part of society. States the need for a "humane approach to this reality, reflecting our unique culture, history and spirit of inclusion.

Reception

Among supporters, the compact was complimented in a New York Times editorial as coming from "people of good sense and good will". The Church of Jesus Christ of Latter-day Saints (LDS Church) notably endorsed the Compact via a public statement, though it declined to sign the Compact itself. The LDS Church counts about half of Utah's residents as its adherents, but the Compact is more controversial in Utah Mormon culture itself.

Criticism

The Utah Compact is alleged by the Minuteman Project, conservative commentator Bob Lonsberry, and former Arizona State Senator Karen Johnson to contain deliberately misleading language intended to subtly promote tolerance of illegal immigration, opposition to enforcement of immigration law, and amnesty for illegal aliens.

See also
Immigration reform

Notes

External links
Official website
Peggy Fletcher Stack,  "LDS Panned on Immigration," Salt Lake Tribune, April 20, 2011
Stewart J Lawrence, "The Latter Day Saints come marching in: Immigration reform has eluded the Obama administration. But a Mormon-backed Republican initiative in Utah may hold the key," The Guardian, March 21, 2010

2010 in American politics
2010 in Utah
Politics of Utah
Illegal immigration to the United States
Utah Legislature
Latter Day Saint movement and society